Mike Petersen is an American politician who serves in the Utah House of Representatives from the 3rd district since 2021. Petersen beat his predecessor, Val Potter, in a Republican primary, where he cited recent tax legislation as the need for change.

Personal life
Mike Petersen graduated from Brigham Young University, receiving his general psychology BS in 1988 and his counseling psychology MEd in 1990. He subsequently studied at Utah State University, earning his instructional design and learning sciences PhD in 2012. He owns an education and training development company, LetterPress Software.

References

Living people
Republican Party members of the Utah House of Representatives
21st-century American politicians
1963 births